William Thomas Manning (May 12, 1866 – November 18, 1949) was a U.S. Episcopal bishop of New York City (1921–1946). He led a major $10 million campaign to raise funds for additional construction on the Cathedral of St. John the Divine, and directed a program to train and employ men from the neighborhood as skilled artisans during the Great Depression and later.

In 1939-40, Manning took a leadership role in the successful effort to force the City University of New York to rescind their offer of a professorship to the philosopher Bertrand Russell.

Biography

Early life and education
William Thomas Manning was born in Northampton, England in 1866. His family moved to the United States in 1882, when he was 16 years old. He entered the University of the South (Sewanee, Tennessee) in 1888, where he studied under William Porcher Du Bose. He obtained a B.D. degree in 1894.

Career
Manning became a deacon on December 12, 1889, and was ordained as a priest on December 12, 1891. He was called to the following:

Rector of Trinity Church, Redlands, California (1891–1893)
Professor of Systematic Divinity at the School of Theology of the University of the South (1893–1895)
Rector of St. John's Church, Lansdowne, Pennsylvania (1896–1898)
Rector of Christ Church, Nashville (1898–1903)
Vicar of St. Agnes', New York (1903–1904)
Assistant rector of Trinity Church, New York (1904–1908)
Rector of Trinity Church, New York (1908–1921)
Bishop of New York (May 11, 1921 – December 31, 1946)

When the Bishop was asked whether salvation could be found outside the Episcopal Church, he replied, "Perhaps so, but no gentleman would care to avail himself of it."

One year prior to the U.S. entering World War I, Manning said:

During World War I, Rev. Manning served as a volunteer chaplain at Camp Upton.

Bishop Manning supported the Oxford Groups of the 1930s (not to be confused with the Oxford Movement of the 1830s, of which he was also a supporter) and in 1925 helped Rev. Sam Shoemaker become rector of Calvary Church, where Shoemaker revived the dwindling missionary congregation and later helped found Alcoholics Anonymous.

From 1922 to 1924, Bishop Manning was in the public eye because of controversies with the Rev. Percy Stickney Grant, who expressed a radical point of view. Manning also came into conflict with the Rev. William Norman Guthrie, because of dancing and other innovations at his religious services in St. Mark's in-the-Bouwerie, New York City.

After the war, as Bishop of the Cathedral of St. John the Divine, Manning led a $10,000,000 capital campaign to revive construction and complete more sections of the church. Under his direction, the cathedral employed and trained neighborhood men as skilled stonemasons and carvers during the decades of the continuing project.

Bishop Manning dedicated The Church of the Epiphany on New York City's Upper East Side on October 29, 1939.

In 1939–40, Bishop Manning took a leadership role in the successful effort to force the City University of New York to rescind their offer of a professorship to the philosopher Bertrand Russell. Russell had publicly testified of his atheism in his book What I Believe, and of his support for what was then called "free love" in Marriage and Morals. A Manhattan court granted victory to Manning and his allies in Kay v. Board of Higher Education, better known as The Bertrand Russell Case.

Manning retired in 1946, and died in 1949. He was buried in the Cathedral of St. John the Divine.

Legacy and honors
For his service during World War I, he was awarded the chevalier of the Légion d'honneur of France and an officer of the Order of the Crown of Belgium.

References

External links

Documents by and about Manning from Project Canterbury
William Manning records at Trinity Wall Street Archives

Episcopal bishops of New York
1866 births
1949 deaths
People from Northampton

Officers of the Order of the Crown (Belgium)